Dogfan, also known as Doewan, was a saint and martyr who lived in 5th century Wales. He is venerated in the Anglican Church , Eastern Orthodox Church, True Orthodox Church, and Roman Catholic Church, on 13 July.

Family
He is the patron saint of Llanrhaeadr-ym-Mochnant in Wales. The town may have been the birthplace of his mother. He was also one of the sons of king Brychan.

Martyrdom
He is said to have been put to death by Anglo-Saxon heathen invaders in Pembrokeshire, where a church was built to his memory.

References

5th-century births
Roman Catholic monks
English Christian monks
Children of Brychan
Year of death missing
5th-century Christian martyrs
Welsh Roman Catholic martyrs
5th-century Welsh people
5th-century Christian saints
5th-century Christian monks